The Women's relay competition at the Biathlon World Championships 2021 was held on 20 February 2021.

Results
The race was started at 11:45.

References

Women's relay